El Mirón is a municipality located in the province of Ávila, Castile and León, Spain. According to the 2006 census (INE), the municipality had a population of 198 inhabitants. The number increased to 207 in 2012.

The name came into attention upon the discovery an Upper Paleolithic (Magdalenian) skeleton in 2015 from the El Mirón Cave. The skeleton was that of a woman and is coated with ochre (a red pigment), hence she is nicknamed The Red Lady of El Mirón. The woman is about 35 to 40 years of age, and was buried around 18,700 years ago.

References

Municipalities in the Province of Ávila